Gideon Cohen is a former Israeli footballer and manager who now works for the youth team of Hapoel Marmorek.

References

Living people
Israeli Jews
Israeli footballers
Maccabi Netanya F.C. managers
Maccabi Sha'arayim F.C. managers
Association footballers not categorized by position
Year of birth missing (living people)
Israeli football managers